The year 1981 in science and technology involved many significant events, listed below.

Biology
 September – Pantanal Matogrossense National Park designated in Brazil.
 Publication of Stephen Jay Gould's critique of biological determinism, The Mismeasure of Man, in the United States.

Chemistry 
 A German research team led by Peter Armbruster and Gottfried Münzenberg at the GSI Helmholtz Centre for Heavy Ion Research (GSI Helmholtzzentrum für Schwerionenforschung) in Darmstadt bombard a target of bismuth-209 with accelerated nuclei of chromium-54 to produce 5 atoms of the isotope bohrium-262

Computer science
 March 5 – The ZX81, a pioneering British home computer, is launched by Sinclair Research, going on to sell over 1.5 million units worldwide.
 April 3 – The Osborne 1, the first successful portable computer, is unveiled at the West Coast Computer Faire in San Francisco.
 July 9 – Nintendo releases the arcade game Donkey Kong featuring the debut of Mario.
 August 12 – The IBM Personal Computer is released.
 September 12 – The Chaos Computer Club, a European association of hackers, is established in Berlin by Wau Holland and others.

Mathematics

Medicine
 April 26 – Dr. Michael R. Harrison of the University of California, San Francisco, performs the world's first human open fetal surgery.
 June 5 – AIDS pandemic begins when the United States Centers for Disease Control and Prevention reports an unusual cluster of Pneumocystis pneumonia in five homosexual men in Los Angeles.
 Bruce Reitz leads the team that performs the first successful heart–lung transplant on Mary Gohlke at Stanford Hospital.
 LeCompte maneuver first performed.
 English psychiatrist Lorna Wing introduces the term "Asperger syndrome".

Space exploration
 April 12 – The first launch of a Space Shuttle: Columbia launches on the STS-1 mission.
 October 6 – UoSAT-1, the first modern microsatellite, is launched into Low Earth orbit.

Technology
 July 7 – Electric aircraft Solar Challenger, designed by an American team led by Paul MacCready and piloted by Stephen Ptacek, makes a 163-mile (262 km) crossing of the English Channel using only solar power from wing-mounted photovoltaic cells.
 July 17 – Hyatt Regency walkway collapse: Structural failure due to a late design change causes two internal suspended walkways at the Hyatt Regency Hotel in Kansas City, Missouri to collapse, killing 114.

Awards
 Nobel Prizes
 Physics – Nicolaas Bloembergen, Arthur Leonard Schawlow, Kai M. Siegbahn
 Chemistry – Kenichi Fukui, Roald Hoffmann
 Medicine – Roger W. Sperry, David H. Hubel, Torsten N. Wiesel
 Turing Award – Edgar F. Codd

Births

Deaths
 January 5
 Frederick Osborn (b. 1889), American philanthropist and eugenicist.
 Harold Urey (b. 1893), American winner of the Nobel Prize in Chemistry. 
 February 26 – Jennie Smillie Robertson (b. 1878), Canadian gynecological surgeon.
 March 8 – Joseph Henry Woodger, British theoretical biologist (b. 1894)
 March 9 – Max Delbrück (b. 1906), German biologist.
 April 3 – Leo Kanner (b. 1894), Austrian American clinical child psychiatrist.
 May 117 – Odd Hassel, Norwegian chemist, Nobel Prize laureate (b. 1897)
 July 4 - Niels Erik Nørlund (b. 1885), Danish mathematician.
 July 27 – Elizabeth Rona (b. 1890), Hungarian American nuclear chemist.
 July 31 – Ernest Melville DuPorte (b. 1891), Black Canadian insect morphologist.
 September 8 – Hideki Yukawa, Japanese physicist, Nobel Prize laureate (b. 1907)
 November 15 – Walter Heitler, German physicist (b. 1904)Fellow of the Royal Society
 November 17 – Sibyl M. Rock (b. 1909), American mathematician.
 November 22 – Hans Krebs (b. 1900), German medical doctor and biochemist; discoverer of the citric acid cycle.
 December 6 – Harry Harlow (b. 1905), American psychologist.

References

 
20th century in science
1980s in science